Epitrix hirtipennis, the tobacco flea beetle, is a species of flea beetle in the family Chrysomelidae. It is found in Central America, North America, Oceania, temperate Asia, and Europe.

References

Further reading

External links

 

Alticini
Articles created by Qbugbot
Beetles described in 1847